Skusea is a mosquito genus (or a subgenus of Aedes) in the family Culicidae. Before the reclassification of aedine genera, Skusea pembaensis was known as Aedes pembaensis.

See also 
 List of mosquito genera

References 

 
 

Mosquito genera
Aedini
Taxa named by Frederick Vincent Theobald